Eugene Pierce Gillespie (September 24, 1852 – December 16, 1899) was a Democratic member of the U.S. House of Representatives from Pennsylvania.

Biography
Gillespie was born in Greenville, Pennsylvania. He attended the public schools, Allegheny College in Meadville, Pennsylvania, and St. Michael's College in Toronto, Ontario, Canada. He studied law, was admitted to the bar in August 1874 and began his legal practice in Greenville.

Gillespie was elected as a Democrat to the Fifty-second Congress. He was an unsuccessful candidate for reelection in 1892.

He continued the practice of law until his death on December 16, 1899. He was buried at the Shenango Valley Cemetery.

References

The Political Graveyard

1852 births
1899 deaths
Pennsylvania lawyers
People from Greenville, Pennsylvania
Democratic Party members of the United States House of Representatives from Pennsylvania
Allegheny College alumni
University of St. Michael's College alumni
19th-century American politicians
19th-century American lawyers